Solo Cup Company is an American manufacturer of disposable consumer products including beverage cups, disposable plates, and bowls. Solo Cup Company is located in Lake Forest, Illinois, and in 2006 had sales of $2.4 billion. On May 4, 2012, Solo Cup Company was acquired by Dart Container.

History

Leo Hulseman, a former employee of the Dixie Co. in the 1930s, created the "Solo Cup", a paper cone he made at his home and sold to bottled-water companies. Later the company developed other products, like wax-coated cups and the plastic Cozy Cup. The wax-coated cups were added to its lineup in the 1950s, as fountain sodas gained popularity.

Leo Hulseman founded the Solo Cup Company in 1936, The company was originally incorporated in 1955 under the name Hulseman Paper Corporation.

In the 1970s, Hulseman's son, Robert Leo Hulseman, came up with the now-ubiquitous (in the United States), red Solo cup. The red Solo cups are made of thick, molded polystyrene. They are known for being able to withstand drops, easily stackable, and disposable while price accessible. Their characteristic red color may conceal the drinking contents.

On June 30, 1980, SOLCO, Inc. and RM LEASING CORPORATION merged into Solo Cup Company. 

On March 1, 2004, Solo acquired Sweetheart Cup Company for $917.2 million, in part with public debt. Sweetheart was founded by Joseph Shapiro and his four brothers, emigrants from Russia. It became the largest consumer packaging company in the world and was sold several times before being acquired by Solo Cup. Following the acquisition, Solo Cup's finances suffered, and Standard & Poor's lowered their credit rating from B to CCC+. In late 2006, Solo Cup was reported to be $1.1 billion in debt.

In 2005, the Museum of Modern Art in New York City added a Solo Cup Traveler's Lid to its permanent collection. The lid was featured because it symbolized innovation and progress in basic product design.

Solo Cup Company closed its longstanding facility in Highland Park, Illinois, in December 2009 and relocated to Lake Forest, Illinois.

On May 4, 2012, Solo Cup Company was acquired by Dart Container.

Management

Founder 
Leo Hulseman (1898–1989) was an active polo player. His wife, Dorothy Donahoe Hulseman (1900–1988), better known by her stage name Dora Hall, was a singer whose records were given away free of charge through Solo promotions. Leo Hulseman was also the founder and owner of Premore Inc. Premore was a television production company on the Culver Studios lot for many years in the 1970s and 1980s, and later moved to North Hollywood. Premore produced children's TV shows including Tony the Pony (like the later Barney & Friends) and The Cliffwood Avenue Kids (like Our Gang). Other programs produced at the Premore facilities included Greystone's The Real West and Candid Camera. Premore's television studio stage, remote truck, and post production were used for Dora Hall's shows and rented for television specials and sports. Dora Hall was most noted for and seen on the Dora Hall TV Show (1979), and she played Rose On Broadway with Frank Sinatra Jr., Donald O'Connor and Scatman Crothers. She also had a TV  special called "Once Upon a Tour". Her songs are found on the Premore, Reinbeau, and Cozy Records labels. Premore Inc. was closed in 1993, four years after the death of Leo Hulseman.

Subsequent management
Robert Leo Hulseman, son of the founder Leo Hulseman and the creator of the iconic red solo cup, served as president. Hulseman died December 21, 2016.

Current CEO Robert M. Korzenski took over from Robert Hulseman in August 2006. Korzenski had worked for Sweetheart Cups for over 10 years.

Customers
Solo Cup customers include Starbucks, Dairy Queen, Così, Walmart, Whole Foods Market, Einstein Bros. Bagels, Publix, and Tim Hortons, as well as many universities.

The red plastic cups are notably used in American college and university games such as beer pong and flip cup. This usage is referenced in Toby Keith's 2011 country music song "Red Solo Cup". The red party cup outsells the blue variety by a wide margin. In part because of its cultural significance, many other manufacturers now produce similar looking red cups. The company is also known for its Jazz cup design, acquired through Sweetheart and sometimes known as "Solo Jazz".

See also
 Red Solo Cup

References

External links 

Company's history timeline
CNN Money profile

Manufacturing companies based in Illinois
Privately held companies based in Illinois
Companies based in Lake Forest, Illinois
American companies established in 1936
Manufacturing companies established in 1936
1936 establishments in Illinois
2012 mergers and acquisitions
Kitchenware brands